Stražišče is a dispersed settlement in the hills north of Ravne na Koroškem in the Carinthia region in northern Slovenia. Part of the settlement lies in the neighbouring Municipality of Prevalje.

References

External links
Stražišče on Geopedia

Populated places in the Municipality of Ravne na Koroškem